Thiais is a commune in the southern suburbs of Paris, France.

The name Thiais comes from Medieval Latin Theodasium or Theodaxium, meaning "estate of Theodasius", a Gallo-Roman landowner.

The Austrian writer Joseph Roth, exiled due to his opposition to the Nazi regime, lived at Thiais at the end of the 1930s and is buried at the local cemetery. The tomb of Russian writer Yevgeny Zamyatin is also there. Expatriate American journalist and novelist William Gardner Smith died there in 1974.

Population

Transport
Thiais is served by Pont de Rungis–Aéroport d'Orly station on Paris RER line C. It is also served by Choisy-le-Roi station on Paris RER line C. This station, although administratively located on the territory of Choisy-le-Roi, lies closer to the town center of Thiais than Pont de Rungis – Aéroport d'Orly station does, and is thus used by people in Thiais.

Education
The commune has:
 Seven preschools (écoles maternelles): Jeanne d'Arc, Romain Gary, Charles Péguy, Jacques Prévert, Saint Exupéry, Robert Schuman, and des Tilleuls
 Six elementary schools: Charles Péguy, Romain Gary, Camille Claudel, Paul Éluard, Saint-Exupéry, and Robert Schuman
 Three junior high schools: Collège Albert Camus, Collège Paul Valéry, and Collège Paul Klee
 Lycée Guillaume Apollinaire, a senior high school/sixth-form college

Monuments
 Paul Celan's grave.
 Farhad Mehrad's grave.  Farhad was cremated and is buried in the Thiais.
 Yevgeny Zamyatin's grave.

See also
Communes of the Val-de-Marne department

References

External links

 Home page 

Communes of Val-de-Marne